The Flying Squad is a 1929 British silent crime film directed by Arthur Maude and starring John Longden, Donald Calthrop and Wyndham Standing. The film was made at Beaconsfield Studios. It was based on the 1928 novel The Flying Squad by Edgar Wallace, which was later remade with sound in 1932 and 1940.

Cast
 John Longden as Inspector John Bradley 
 Donald Calthrop as Sederman 
 Wyndham Standing as Mark McGill 
 Henry Vibart as Tiser 
 Laurence Ireland as Ronnie Perryman 
 Dorothy Bartlam as Ann Parryman 
 John Nedgnol as Li Joseph 
 Eugenie Prescott as Mrs. Schifan 
 Carol Reed as Offender 
 Bryan Edgar Wallace as Offender

References

External links

1929 films
British crime films
British silent feature films
1929 crime films
Films directed by Arthur Maude
Films based on British novels
Films based on works by Edgar Wallace
Films shot at Beaconsfield Studios
Films set in London
British black-and-white films
1920s police procedural films
British police films
1920s English-language films
1920s British films